Laureen is a given name. Notable people with the name include:

Laureen Harper (born 1963), the wife of Canada's 22nd Prime Minister Stephen Harper
Laureen Jarrett (born 1938), teacher and former political figure in New Brunswick, Canada
Laureen Oliver, American politician who co-founded the New York State Independence Party

See also
 Lauren (disambiguation)